The 2019 Patriot League women's basketball tournament will be held from March 9, 11, 14 and 17 at campus sites of the higher seed, except that both semi-final games will be played at the same site of the highest seed. The winner will earn an automatic trip to the NCAA women's tournament. Bucknell won the conference tournament championship game over American, 66–54. Kaitlyn Slagus was named the tournament's Most Valuable Player.

Seeds
Teams are seeded by conference record, with ties broken in the following order:
 Head-to-head record between the teams involved in the tie
 Record against the highest-seeded team not involved in the tie, going down through the seedings as necessary
 Higher RPI entering the tournament, as published by College Basketball News

American, Bucknell, Holy Cross, BU, and Lehigh received first round byes.

Schedule

Bracket

References

External links
2019 Patriot League Women's Basketball Championship

Tournament
Patriot League women's basketball tournament